Dozens of aviators were credited as flying aces in the Korean War from 1950 to 1953. The number of total flying aces, who are credited with downing five or more enemy aircraft in air-to-air combat, is disputed in the war.

The Korean War saw the first widespread use of jet engine-powered fighter aircraft for both sides of a war. Subsequently, difficulty arose in crediting the number of victories for each side, thanks in part to poor records, intentional overestimation, and the difficulty of confirming crashes in MiG Alley, where the majority of air-to-air combat took place in the war. As a result, there is a large discrepancy on both sides as to the number of victories claimed versus aircraft lost, and it is extremely difficult to determine the accuracy of many victories. The ace status of dozens of pilots still remains in question.

Aviators from four nations may have qualified as aces during the Korean War; between six and nine aces have been estimated for China and up to four in North Korea. Pilots of the Soviet Union had the most difficulty confirming victories and accurately determining which pilots achieved ace status, and between 34 and 60 pilots from that nation have been postulated as possible aces in the war. For the United Nations, the United States was the only country with pilots to attain ace status, with 40. No pilot from another UN country attained ace status, though many claimed victories. Among these, Royal Canadian Air Force pilot Ernest A. Glover claimed three victories.

Controversy
The status of many claimed aces in the Korean War has been increasingly debated as more data becomes available, showing that instances of over-claiming abounded on both sides.

An example of this occurred on 20 May 1951, when the war's largest fighter battle to date took place between 28 F-86 Sabres and 30 MiG-15s. After this battle the Americans claimed three MiGs (including two for James Jabara) and the Soviets claimed four Sabres (including one for Yevgeny Pepelyaev). In fact, each side lost only one aircraft.

The Americans claimed that Jabara was their first jet ace after the 20 May combat but, apart from the discrepancy on that date, he was also credited with a kill in a 12 April 1951 combat in which the Americans claimed a total of 11 MiGs shot down when the Soviets actually lost only one fighter. For their part, the Soviets claimed 15 Boeing B-29 kills on that date when the Americans only lost four in the combat itself and six written-off later.

Compounding the problem, both sides were using jet engine-powered fighter aircraft on a large scale for the first time, and the high speeds of combat made visual identification of damaged and destroyed aircraft difficult. USAF pilots were credited with a kill if the gun camera showed their guns striking the enemy aircraft even if no one actually saw it go down. After the war the USAF reviewed its figures in an investigation code-named Sabre Measure Charlie and downgraded the kill ratio of the North American F-86 Sabre against the Mikoyan-Gurevich MiG-15 by half. The Soviets also had lax standards for confirming kills at the beginning of the war, leading to widespread over-claiming. Both sides made extensive use of gun cameras to better track effectiveness, but Soviet cameras were less effective, further contributing to over-claiming.

Records from the United Nations show that 40 American pilots reached ace status. However, records from China, the Soviet Union, and North Korea conflict widely and accounts vary on how many aircraft on each side were lost and who is credited with the victories. Air victory claims, which are often controversial between two sides of a war, were particularly difficult to measure in Korea thanks to the difficulty recovering crashed aircraft and confirming losses, as well as poor records for the two sides which fought the bulk of their engagements in an area known as MiG Alley.

The number of aircraft lost during the war is in dispute among both the UN and the Soviet bloc nations. UN pilots claim 840 aircraft shot down during the war, while Chinese, Soviet, and North Korean sources indicate only 600 were lost among the three nations, including non-combat losses. Conversely, the Soviet Union sources claim to have shot down 800 UN aircraft, while the US claims to have lost only 100 aircraft in combat. Overestimation of victories on both sides has been attributed to the stress and confusion of air combat situations during the war, as well as the tendency for pilots to deliberately exaggerate claims for career advancement. Historians suggest that numbers in these nations were deliberately exaggerated for propaganda purposes and to appease their superiors. For example, Soviet pilots faced penalties for perceived failure or ineffectiveness, making inaccurate or false claims of victories more common. Conversely, data-matching with Soviet records shows that US pilots claimed up to 400 per cent more kills in some combats than they actually achieved, and that they routinely attributed their own combat losses to landing accidents and "other causes".

The Soviet bloc nations claim to have destroyed a combined total of between 1,000 and 1,600 UN aircraft in air-to-air combat, the most common number in sources being 1,106 UN aircraft total, including 651 F-86 Sabres. The most authoritative Soviet numbers indicate 1,016 UN aircraft, including 595 Sabres. Chinese sources claim an additional 330 victories, including 211 Sabres. The most common number used is a total of 271 victories for China and North Korea. Other, more recent works claim 1,337 UN aircraft.

During the entire course of the war, UN air forces lost about 3,000 aircraft. The United States Air Force (USAF) reported a total of 516 non-combat losses and 1,466 aircraft lost in combat missions, with 757 of them lost to enemy fire Of these 139 were destroyed in air-to-air combat, 305 were unknown causes and 472 were "other losses". Of these, just 78 Sabres were listed as lost in air-to-air combat, 26 were unknown causes and 61 were "other losses". The United States Navy and United States Marine Corps lost 1,248 aircraft to all causes and the other UN countries lost about 300 aircraft.
	
Tallying claims for the many Soviet pilots who claim to have achieved ace status is extremely difficult. The system of claims awards in the Soviet Union was unclear and appears to have been highly inconsistent during the war. There is also no single list of victories for each pilot in the Soviet Union, with numbers instead drawn from after action reports and accounts from pilots and unit leaders. These complications, in addition to the intentional exaggeration of kills in order to please superiors, means that the about 50 Soviet pilots claiming ace status have a total number of victories which far exceeds the number of aircraft the UN lost in the Korean War's air battles. Realizing the chronic problem with false claims, Soviet leaders began to tighten the criteria for confirming victories in 1952. As a result, far fewer Soviet pilots were made aces in the second half of the war.

Similarly, data-matching shows that US aces also over-claimed.  For example, the US claimed that James Jabara became the world's first jet-versus-jet ace during his first tour of duty, but Soviet data shows he didn't achieve ace status until his second tour.

List of aces

China
Various sources claim that between six and nine Chinese pilots attained ace status during the course of the war. A USAF report listed six Chinese pilots attained ace status during the Korean War. Although all Chinese aces have received the title Combat Hero in acknowledgement of their services, very little information is known of the Chinese pilots during the war due to the lack of published records.

North Korea
There is some controversy as to whether any pilots of the North Korean People's Air Force attained ace status. Various sources claim there were either zero, two or four aces from North Korea. Research by the USAF in 1999 concluded two North Korean pilots may have attained the status. However, historian Michael J. Varhola subsequently contended that Chinese and Soviet records indicate it is unlikely any North Korean pilots attained enough victories for ace status.

Soviet Union
Various sources claim between 43 and 60 pilots from the Soviet Union attained ace status in the war. Most sources claim around 50 pilots attained ace status during the Korean War, of whom many are very controversial. Research by the USAF named 52 pilots who may have had legitimate claim to the title. Little is known of some of the pilots and their combined tally is incompatible with the number of aircraft the USAF claims to have lost in the war. Subsequent independent sources generally agree the number of aces claimed was around 52, but 15 names differ among the lists, particularly lower-scoring pilots. The number of victories for virtually all of the ace pilots is subject to dispute. Listed are names of 67 Soviet pilots attributed as aces in various sources. Of these, the ace status of 30 are in question among historians.

United States
Of 40 United States military servicemen who attained ace status in Korea, all but one of them flew primarily the F-86 Sabre during their air-to-air fights. Early in the war against the older North Korean People's Air Force aircraft, US pilots flew a variety of aircraft including the F-51 Mustang, F-80 Shooting Star and F-82 Twin Mustang. However, with the introduction of the MiG-15 when the People's Liberation Army Air Force entered the war, only the Sabre fighter could match the Soviet-built fighters in single combat.

Similarly to the Chinese and Soviet aces, the kill totals of many American pilots are disputed. Their combined tally is incompatible with recorded losses by communist forces, and data-matching with Soviet records shows that many of the aces' claimed kills were erroneous. In some cases, American pilots over-claimed by 400 per cent after air combat.

The pilots who attained ace status in the war scored a disproportionate number of kills in the war. Of 1,000 fighter pilots who served in the war, only 355 were credited with aerial victories. A total of 756.5 victories were credited for aircraft shot down by the UN, with the 40 aces shooting down a total of 310.5 aircraft, or 40 percent of the total. The top five aces are credited with a combined ten percent of the UN aircraft victories of the war. In addition to the 40 pilots who attained ace status in the Korean War, another 17 US pilots who had been aces in World War II claimed additional kills in the Korean War. Two Canadian World War II aces, J. Lindsay and John McKay, also garnered additional kills in the war.

References

Footnotes

Citations

Sources

 

Ace
Korean War
Korean War flying aces